Matthew S. Meyer is an American politician and attorney who is currently serving his second term as New Castle County Executive. A member of the Democratic Party, he was elected New Castle County Executive in 2016 and again in 2020. Meyer speaks fluent Swahili and conversational Spanish. He has also studied Hebrew, Arabic, French and Wolof. He is generally seen as a member of the progressive wing of the Democratic Party.

Early life and education 
Meyer was born in Bay City, Michigan, and grew up in Wilmington, Delaware. He graduated from Wilmington Friends School, Brown University (cum laude in political science and computer science), and the University of Michigan Law School (member, Michigan Law Review).

Meyer worked on then-U.S. Senator Joe Biden’s first presidential campaign in 1988 while in high school at the Wilmington Friends School. He then worked on the upstart, successful, 1990 gubernatorial campaign of Bruce Sundlun while attending Brown University.

Career 
Meyer joined Teach for America, and taught public school in Washington, D.C. for three years.  He also taught at Prestige Academy in Wilmington. He won a Skadden Fellowship upon graduation from law school and used it to work for Community Legal Aid in Wilmington.  He then became an attorney working in mergers and acquisitions with Simpson Thatcher and Bartlett. He served in Iraq as a diplomat for the U.S. State Department, as a senior economic adviser on the ground in Mosul, Iraq, working with military and economic aid leaders to assist the Iraqi people. Later, he worked as an economic advisor to Delaware Governor Jack Markell and was a partner at Potomac Law Group.  In 2003 at the Kennedy Center in Washington, Meyer was awarded the Sam Beard Jefferson Award for the Greatest Public Service by an Individual 35 Years and Under; at that same ceremony Condoleezza Rice received a Jefferson Award.

New Castle County Executive

2016 election 
In the Democratic primary for New Castle County Executive, Meyer's campaign focused on integrity and economic policy.  On September 13, Meyer upset three-term incumbent Tom Gordon by a margin of 4.66% in the primary, winning 21,487 votes (52.33%) to Gordon's 19,678 votes (47.67%).  Meyer defeated Republican Mark Blake in the general election in November with 67% of the vote. He took office on January 3, 2017.

2020 election 
Meyer, who has been described as a progressive, faced a primary challenge in 2020 from Maggie Jones. Jones was criticized for her previous support for Donald Trump and the Republican Party, with one liberal outlet nicknaming her "MAGA Jones". She was also criticized for being funded by police unions, while Jones claimed Meyer's county government was not "transparent". In July 2020, Meyer faced allegations he made "belligerent" calls to two mayors who were supporting his opponent, Maggie Jones, in the 2020 Democratic primary for New Castle County Executive. Both Elsmere mayor Eric Scott Thompson and Newark mayor Jerry Clifton said Meyer's phone conversations with them were heated, and they felt the county executive made threats toward their communities by telling them that he "will remember this." Meyer refused to specifically address the accusations. On September 15, Meyer won the Democratic nomination again for County Executive, defeating centrist challenger Maggie Jones in the Democratic primary. Meyer won 43,833 votes (56.51%), while Jones received 33,735 votes (43.49%). Meyer won the general election unopposed.

Appointments 
Meyer selected the first African-American police chief and chief administrative officer in the 106-year history of the New Castle County Police Department.

COVID-19 response 
A joint report by National Association of Counties and National Academy of Public Administration on the use of federal CARES Act funds recognized New Castle County for using “innovative strategies in deploying Coronavirus Relief Fund dollars, with special attention to programs focusing on inclusive economic recovery and on assisting vulnerable and underserved populations.” 

In a July 2020 editorial for The News Journal, Meyer advocated for sending all teachers and students back to school in the fall during the coronavirus pandemic.

In October 2020, New Castle County purchased the former Sheraton South Hotel at auction with a winning bid of $19.5 million, also using CARES funds. The hotel can house more than 350 residents. The facility officially opened its doors in December 2020.

2022 Regional Emmy Win 
Meyer was awarded a regional Emmy in the Societal Concerns, Long-Form category at the 2022 Mid-Atlantic Emmy Awards as an Executive Producer on the short film "The Pathway Home" which chronicles the origins and first year of The Hope Center, a hotel-turn-homeless shelter New Castle County opened to house the homeless during the COVID-19 pandemic.

Potential 2024 gubernatorial run 
Meyer, as a second-term County Executive, is limited to serving two consecutive terms in office. He is widely considered a front-runner for the Democratic Party's nomination for Governor of Delaware in 2024.

Political positions

Policing 
Meyer faced protests from police unions in 2017 and 2019 due to disagreement over contract negotiations. Meyer responded, "I'm not going to give double or triple the salary increases to senior union leadership over the union membership. That's the line I'm drawing on behalf of the taxpayers of the county." Meyer supports the Black Lives Matter movement, and spoke of his support for the guilty verdict in the murder trial of Derek Chauvin, a police officer who murdered an unarmed black man, George Floyd.

Following the 2021 police killing of 30-year old Lymond Moses, Meyer ordered the release of body camera footage of the incident against the request of police unions, saying that New Castle County residents have a "right to transparency". Moses's family supported Meyer's decision.

Immigration 
In May 2017, Meyer issued an executive order forbidding New Castle County law enforcement from stopping, questioning, searching, or arresting an individual because of their immigration status, and forbidding county officials from cooperating with federal immigration enforcement operations, effectively making New Castle County a sanctuary county. Speaking on the executive order, Meyer stated, "Our county police, their job is to keep us all safe. Their job is not to execute and implement the immigration laws of the United States. Nor is the job of librarians or other people working for county government."

Minimum wage 
Meyer supports a $15 an hour minimum wage, and raised the minimum wage for county workers to $15 an hour.

Marijuana 
Meyer is an advocate for the legalization of marijuana, and wrote an opinion piece in 2022 criticizing Governor John Carney's decision vetoing the bill to legalize marijuana in Delaware and encouraged the state legislature to override Carney's veto.

References

External links 
 2020 campaign website

Year of birth missing (living people)
Living people
Delaware Democrats
New Castle County Executives
People from Wilmington, Delaware
Brown University alumni
University of Michigan Law School alumni
Simpson Thacher & Bartlett
Teach For America alumni